Dharwad North Lok Sabha constituency was a Lok Sabha (parliamentary) constituency in Karnataka state in southern India. With the implementation of the delimitation of parliamentary constituencies in 2008, it ceased to exist.

Assembly segments
Dharwad North Lok Sabha constituency comprised the following eight Legislative Assembly segments:
 Dharwad Rural
 Dharwad
 Hubli
 Hubli Rural
 Kalghatgi
 Gadag
 Naragund
 Navalgund

Members of Parliament

2008 onwards: Constituency does not exist. See Dharwad Lok Sabha constituency and Haveri Lok Sabha constituency

See also
 Dharwad district
 Dharwad Lok Sabha constituency
 Dharwad South Lok Sabha constituency
 Haveri Lok Sabha constituency
 List of former constituencies of the Lok Sabha

Notes

Hubli–Dharwad
Former constituencies of the Lok Sabha
2008 disestablishments in India
Constituencies disestablished in 2008
Former Lok Sabha constituencies of Karnataka